University College Hospital is a teaching hospital in London, England.

University College Hospital may also refer to:

University College London Hospitals NHS Foundation Trust, the NHS foundation trust which includes UCH
UCH Macmillan Cancer Centre
UCLH/UCL Biomedical Research Centre
University College Hospital at Westmoreland Street
University College Hospital Medical School
University College Hospital Galway, hospital in Galway, Ireland
University College Hospital, Ibadan, teaching hospital in Ibadan, Nigeria